The following are the national records in athletics in Brunei maintained by Brunei's national athletics federation: Brunei Darussalam Athletics Federation (BDAF).

Outdoor

Men

Women

Indoor

Men

Women

References

External links

Brunei
Records
Athletics